is a film and anime sound effects production and distribution company established on 1963-08-01 and located in the San'ei-chō district of Shinjuku, Tokyo, Japan. They also operate under the name .

Main staff
Kazumi Suzuki (Director of Public Relations)
Satoshi Honzan
Toshiki Kameyama
Kunio Kuwabara
Tadayuki Nukazuka
Makoto Uchida

Former staff
Naoko Asaka
Kazuo Harada
Shigeharu Shiba
Kazuhiro Wakabayashi

Works
Castle in the Sky (film)
Fushigiboshi no Futagohime (TV series)
Future Boy Conan (TV series)
Gakuen Utopia Manabi Straight! (TV series)
Getsumento Heiki Mina (TV series)
Hidamari Sketch (TV series)
High School! Kimengumi (TV series, film)
My Neighbor Totoro (film)
Maison Ikkoku (TV, films)
Nausicaä of the Valley of the Wind (film)
Patlabor (TV, films)
Princess Tutu (TV series)
Ranma ½ (TV, films)
Red Garden (TV series)
Shōnen Onmyōji (TV series)
StrayDog: Kerberos Panzer Cops (film)
The Red Spectacles (film)
Urusei Yatsura (TV, films)
Violinist of Hameln (TV series)
Welcome to the N.H.K. (TV series)
Yoake Mae yori Ruri Iro na (TV series)

External links
 Omnibus Promotion (official site)

Anime industry
Japanese companies established in 1963
Mass media companies based in Tokyo
Film sound production